Men in Black  is a 1934 short subject directed by Raymond McCarey starring American slapstick comedy team The Three Stooges (Moe Howard, Larry Fine and Jerry Howard). It is the third entry in the series released by Columbia Pictures starring the comedians, who released 190 short subjects for the studio between 1934 and 1959.

Men in Black is the only Stooge film ever nominated for an Academy Award for Best Short Subject - Comedy.

Plot
The trio play medical school graduates whose only credentials are that they had the highest temperatures in their class. (They are hired as doctors at the Los Arms Hospital solely because they have been in their senior class for too many years.) The new graduates at the hospital are warned by the superintendent (Dell Henderson) that the Stooges are "not overly bright," but it is promised that their identities will be concealed as long as they promise to devote their lives to "the glorious cause of duty and humanity", which prompts the three to step forward and thank him profusely for not being able to let their identities be known. The superintendent has told the Stooges to rush and answer the loudspeaker whenever their names are called. The short consists of a series of skits in which the Stooges go from one patient to the next, making mistakes ranging from drinking a patient's medicine to sewing their tools inside a man on the operating table.

Each time the Stooges rush and answer the loudspeaker, a different scenario takes place:
 They rush to answer using a three-person bike. When they arrive they respond by "calling all cars". Several people appear in the hallway. After taking a woman's temperature they dismiss her and clear the area.
 The loudspeaker orders them to various rooms to check on patients.
 They report to the superintendent with their results.
 They rush to answer riding a horse, where they end up greeting a telegram delivery man. The man reveals that the telegram is from Nellie (a love interest of all three men) who says she'll marry the man who does the greatest thing for "duty and humanity". They bet him "double or nothing" for his fee on a coin toss which they win by cheating. Afterwards they "help" observe a "comatose" patient.
 They report back to the supervisor who orders them to check on a dangerous patient. They rush to his room using mini-race cars. The patient (Billy Gilbert) is mentally unstable and makes outlandish claims such as rats appearing through a hole in his shirt. The trio prepares medicine but drink it themselves. The patient then claims he sees a "giant green canary". Moe scoffs at this whereupon a green canary enters the room through the window and landing on his shoulder, frightening everyone, the patient included.
 After dealing with the supposedly dangerous patient, the superintendent tells them that 20 men have been injured in an accident at the oil well and they need the radium out of the safe to save their lives. However, he had accidentally swallowed the combination. The Stooges perform an operation on the reluctant superintendent and retrieve the combination. But they mistakenly leave their tools inside him.
 They are finally fed up with the loudspeaker and smash it to pieces. Ultimately they pull out their revolvers and destroy the die-hard, still-working part of the loudspeaker, which exclaims in its swan song "Oh, they got me!" The short ends with the trio raises their guns and proudly proclaiming: "For duty and humanity!"

Every time the Stooges leave the superintendent's office, Curly accidentally ends up breaking the glass door to his office. On their final entry a maintenance worker (having gotten tired of constantly replacing it) intentionally breaks the door for them and bows as they enter.

Cast

Credited
 Moe Howard as Dr. Moe Howard
 Larry Fine as Dr. Larry Fine
 Curly Howard as Dr. Curley Howard

Uncredited
 Dell Henderson as Dr. Graves
 Bud Jamison as Tiny Patient's Doctor 
 Billy Gilbert as D. T. patient
 Jeanie Roberts as Hiccupping nurse
 "Little Billy" Rhodes as Midget in bed
 Ruth Hiatt as Whispering nurse
 Hank Mann as Window glass installer
 Harold Kening as voiced of P.A. announcer
 Phyllis Crane as Anna Conda
 Bob Callahan as Western Union Messenger

Production and significance
Filming for Men in Black took place from August 28 to September 1, 1934. It holds the distinction of being the Stooge short released the fastest after its filming concluded at just 27 days. The opening title music, "I Thought I Wanted You," composed Archie Gottler and Edward Eliscu, is unique to this and previous film, Punch Drunks.

Men in Black contains the first appearance of many gags used in later shorts. For instance, this is the first of several Stooge shorts in which one of the three Stooges charges into or out of an office with a door that has a large plate-glass window, slamming the door behind them and causing the plate glass in the door to shatter. It is also the first of many shorts where the Stooges make a liquid concoction of something (in this case, medicine) by randomly pouring together various liquids with gibberish names (a similar gag is sometimes used where the Stooges pass each other various tools with nonsensical names while operating). The Stooges have several off-the-wall dialogues with nurses, particularly the "hiccuping nurse" played by Jeanie Roberts, who affects a girlish Betty Boop-like voice. As well, this is the first short which shows the Stooges repeatedly engage in a huddle while planning something out.

This film also contains the famous recurring dispatcher line "Calling Doctor Howard, Doctor Fine, Doctor Howard." In this short, the three doctors get so sick and tired of the repeated calls that they decided to tear down the dispatcher's call board and, when a small transmitter appears on the floor, quivering and still repeating "Doctor Howard! Doctor Fine! Doctor Howard!", they all take out handguns and shoot it, causing the dispatcher to say "Oh! They got me!". The Stooges then lift a toast and repeat the film's catch-phrase: "For duty and humanity!"  Part of the dispatcher's call board was also used in the background of the dogwashing facility in the Stooges' 1938 short, Mutts to You.

The film title Men in Black is a spoof of the Clark Gable and Myrna Loy 1934 movie Men in White, released earlier that year. The Stooges, in fact, wear mostly white outfits for this film. The short is also significant in that it was the only time that the trio would be nominated for an Academy Award for Best Short Subject - Comedy.

Men in Black also represents an early use of what has come to be described as hammerspace. The Stooges go to the storage closet to acquire modes of transportation to get them to their patients. They are seen riding a three-man bicycle, a horse, and then individual go-carts out of the closet. A colorized version of this film was released in 2004. It was part of the DVD collection, Goofs on the Loose.

Notes
 The Hospital Race car mini-game is featured in the Apple IIGS game, The Three Stooges. The Stooges must race to the emergency room before time runs out and avoid the patients.

References

External links 
 
 
 Men in Black at threestooges.net

1934 films
The Three Stooges films
American black-and-white films
1934 comedy films
Films directed by Ray McCarey
Medical-themed films
Films set in hospitals
Columbia Pictures short films
American slapstick comedy films
Films with screenplays by Felix Adler (screenwriter)
1930s English-language films
1930s American films